The following is the complete list of the 291 Virtual Console titles that have been released for the Nintendo 3DS in Japan sorted by system and release dates. English translations are highlighted between parentheses.

Available titles
The following is the complete list of the 279 Virtual Console titles available for purchase for the Nintendo 3DS in Japan sorted by system and release dates.

Game Boy
There are 70 games available to purchase.

Game Boy Color
There are 22 games available to purchase.

Game Gear
There are 22 games available to purchase.

Famicom
There are 97 Famicom games and 14 Disk System games available to purchase.

Super Famicom
There are 49 games available to purchase on the New Nintendo 3DS platforms (New Nintendo 3DS, New Nintendo 3DS LL and New Nintendo 2DS LL).

PC Engine
There are 3 games available to purchase.

Delisted titles
There are 4 games that were previously available for purchase but are not anymore.

Game Boy

Game Boy Color

PC Engine

Promotion-exclusive titles
The following is the complete list of the 13 Virtual Console titles which were available for the Nintendo 3DS in Japan exclusively by special promotion, sorted by system and release dates.

Famicom
There is 1 game which was promotion-exclusive.

Game Boy Color
There are 2 games which were promotion-exclusive.

Game Boy Advance
There are 10 games which were promotion-exclusive. These are the 10 Game Boy Advance games that were available exclusively for Nintendo 3DS Ambassadors.

See also
List of Virtual Console games for Wii (Japan)
List of Virtual Console games for Wii U (Japan)
List of DSiWare games and applications
3D Classics

References

Video game lists by platform
Nintendo-related lists